NGC 359 is an elliptical galaxy located approximately 238 million light-years from the Solar System in the constellation Cetus. It was discovered on September 2, 1864, by Albert Marth. It was described by Dreyer as "extremely faint, very small."

This elliptical galaxy has an extremely long tidal tail and shell structure, seen across several deep-sky surveys, indicating a likely-recent and possibly ongoing interaction with nearby galactic neighbor NGC 364.

See also 
 List of NGC objects (1–1000)

References

External links 
 
 
 SEDS

0359
18640902
Cetus (constellation)
Elliptical galaxies
003817